"Tryin' to Beat the Morning Home" is a song co-written and recorded by American country music artist T. G. Sheppard.  It was released in February 1975 as the second single from the album T. G. Sheppard.  The song was Sheppard's second hit on the country chart as well as his second number one.  The single stayed at number one for a single week and spent a total of twelve weeks on the country chart.  It was written by Sheppard, Elroy Kahanek and Red Williams.

Chart performance

References

T. G. Sheppard songs
1975 singles
1975 songs
Songs written by Elroy Kahanek
Songs written by T. G. Sheppard